Alpheias gitonalis is a species of snout moth in the genus Alpheias. It was described by Ragonot, in 1891, and is known from Mexico.

References

Moths described in 1891
Cacotherapiini
Moths of Central America